Ingemann Bylling Jensen (12 December 1925 – 9 September 2003) was a Danish sailor. He competed in the 5.5 Metre event at the 1952 Summer Olympics.

References

External links
 

1925 births
2003 deaths
Danish male sailors (sport)
Olympic sailors of Denmark
Sailors at the 1952 Summer Olympics – 5.5 Metre
People from Horsens
Sportspeople from the Central Denmark Region